The New Zealand national cricket team toured Pakistan in October to November 1976 and played a three-match Test series against the Pakistan national cricket team. Pakistan won the Test series 2–0. New Zealand were captained by Glenn Turner and Pakistan by Mushtaq Mohammad.

Tour matches summary
First tour match

Second tour match

First Test

Only ODI

Third tour match

Second Test

Third Test

References

External links
 New Zealand in Pakistan, 1976-77 at Cricinfo
 New Zealand to Pakistan and India 1976-77 at Test Cricket Tours

1976 in New Zealand cricket
1976 in Pakistani cricket
1976
International cricket competitions from 1975–76 to 1980
Pakistani cricket seasons from 1970–71 to 1999–2000